The men's singles at the 2007 Pan American Games was played at the Riocentro Sports Complex, Pavilion 4B. The competition was held between July 14 and 19.

Medals

Draw

Finals

Top Half

Bottom Half

Badminton at the 2007 Pan American Games